The 2015 Port Vila Shield  was the 3rd edition of the Port Vila Shield, which placed the teams from the 2014–15 TVL Premier League against each other in a cup format. This cup acts a sort of warm-up for the second part of the league in the following months. The competition was held at the Port Vila Municipal Stadium.

Teams 
Amicale FC
Erakor Golden Star
Ifira Black Bird
Narak Tegapu
Shepherds United
Spirit 08
Tafea
Tupuji Imere

Group stage

Group A

Group B

Playoffs

Semi-finals

Final

References 

Port